Football Club Barkchi Hisor formerly known as Barqi Tojik Hisor is football club based in Hisor in Tajikistan. They currently play in the top division of the country, and formerly played in the Soviet Second League.

History
Prior to the 2015 Tajik Season, Energetik Dushanbe were renamed Barqi Tojik Hisor.

On 9 June 2017, Barkchi appointed Mubin Ergashev as their manager after Vitaliy Levchenko joined the coaching staff of Krylia Sovetov.

Names

Domestic history

Managers
 Oraz Nazarov
 Hadi Bargizar (2011–??)
 Mubin Ergashev (2017–2018)

See also
 Bargh Shiraz F.C.

References

External links
Official club website 

Football clubs in Tajikistan
Football clubs in Dushanbe
Association football clubs established in 2006